This is an episode listing of VR Troopers.

Series overview

Episodes

Season 1 (1994–95)

Season 2 (1995–96)

External links
 

VR Troopers
VR Troopers episodes list of